Lantian County is a county under the administration of Xi'an, the capital of Shaanxi province, China. It is the easternmost and second-most spacious (after Zhouzhi County) of the 13 county-level divisions of Xi'an. The county borders the prefecture-level cities of Weinan to the northeast and Shangluo to the southeast, Lintong District to the north, Chang'an District to the west, and Baqiao District to the northwest.

Toponymy 

History 
The county was named for the nearby Lantian Mountain. Numerous ancient Chinese texts, such as the Taiping Huanyu Ji and the Rites of Zhou state that the mountain was renown for its jade.

From 446 CE to 487 CE, under the Xianbei-led Northern Wei, Lantian County was merged into Bacheng County. Upon its restoration, it was placed under the jurisdiction of Jingzhao Commandery.

During this period, Lantian County was abolished, and Lantian Commandery administered two counties formed in its place: Yushan County and Bailu County. Upon the restoration of Lantian County in 573 CE, the county's seat of government was moved to the ancient city of Yaoliu, located in present-day .

In 619 CE, during the Tang dynasty, Bailu County was restored. Yushan County was also re-established the same year, with its seat of government in present-day . The following year Bailu County was renamed to Ningmin County. Both counties were abolished again in 629 CE, and merged back into Lantian County, which was now under the jurisdiction of Jingzhao Fu.

Beginning in 1928, the county was under direct administration from the province of Shaanxi.

The following year, Weinan District was re-organized as Weinan Prefecture. From 1956 to 1958, the county was directed administered by Shaanxi. In 1958, it was placed under the jurisdiction of Xi'an. From 1961 to 1983, Lantian County was returned to Weinan Prefecture. Weinan Prefecture. In 1983, Lantian County was once again placed under Xi'an, which it remains today.

In 2011, the county's 12 townships were reorganized as towns. On February 13, 2015, three of the county's towns were merged into other towns, and the town of Languan was reorganized as the county's sole subdistrict.

Administrative divisions
Lantian County is divided into 1 subdistrict and 18 towns. These township-level divisions then in turn govern 9 residential communities and 337 administrative villages.

Subdistricts 

Towns 
The county's 18 towns are as follows:

  (/)
 
 
 
 
 
 
 
 
 
 
 
 
 
 
 
 
 

Former administrative divisions 

  (merged into Wangchuan in 2015)
  (merged into Sanguanmiao in 2015)
  (merged into Tangyu in 2015)
 Languan (upgraded to Languan Subdistrict in 2015)

Demographics 

A 2012 estimate put the county's permanent population at 518,800. Per the 2010 Chinese Census, Lantian County's population totaled 514,026, down from the 560,283 recorded in the 2000 Chinese Census. Lantian County comprised 6.07% of Xi'an's population in 2010, down from 7.70% in 2000. A 1996 estimate put the county's population at about 605,000.

Climate

Transport
China National Highway 312

See also
Lantian Man
Shangchen, palaeolithic site in Lantian
Wangchuan ji

References

External links

County-level divisions of Shaanxi
Geography of Xi'an